Copa Bolivia was the third tier of the Bolivian Football pyramid. The inaugural season was played in 2012, and the last season was played in 2016. The Copa Bolivia comprised the nine runners-up of the Regional Leagues, the runners-up of the Torneo Nacional Interprovincial and two invited teams. The best three teams of the competition were promoted to the Liga Nacional B.

Teams had to use at least one U-20 player throughout any match; likewise, the number of non-Bolivian players was limited to a maximum of four players at any given point of a match.

List of Champions

Notes

See also 
Copa Bolivia

References 

   
Bol